Levet may refer to:

People
 Fabrice Levet (born 1959), French sailor
 Henry Jean-Marie Levet (1874–1906), French diplomat and poet
 Richard Harrington Levet (1894–1980), American judge
 Robert Levet (1705–1782), friend of Samuel Johnson
 Sandrine Levet (born 1982), French rock climber
 Thomas Levet (born 1968), French golfer

Places
 Levet, Cher, commune in the Cher department in the Centre-Val de Loire region of France

Music 

 Levet, an Old English name for a morning bugle call